Afrique & Histoire was a French peer-reviewed academic journal devoted to the study of African history from antiquity to the present day. It was established in 2003 by Peter Boilley, Jean-Pierre Chrétien, François-Xavier Fauvelle-Aymar, and Bertrand Hirsch and is published biannually by Editions Verdier. Last published volume was 7 (2009).

References

Biannual journals
Publications established in 2003
African history journals
French-language journals